Legend of Djel is an adventure game developed by Coktel Vision and Inférence and published in 1989 by Tomahawk for Amiga, Atari ST, and MS-DOS.

Plot 
The player takes the role of a gnome named Djel. On their deathbed, his parents ask him to clear their name, proving they were of good moral character and not the magic-using troublemakers they were known for. He also needs to defeat a sorcerer.

Gameplay 

The game is a point-and-click adventure with 30 screens.

Development 
Tomahawk was launched as a sister company to Coktel Vision in early 1989. Its first release, Emmanuelle, was negatively reviewed by critics. Legend of Djel previewed in Amiga Computing in August 1989. The sorcerer's daughter is visually based on the girlfriend of the game's graphic artist.

Reception 
Amiga Computing criticised both the gameplay and story for being unoriginal. Amiga Format felt the game had neither appeal nor depth. The Retro Spirit thought it was "a bizarre creation only the French knows how to do". The Games Machine felt the title was graphically and sonically impressive.

References

External links 
 Amiga Joker review(German)
 ASM review

1989 video games
Amiga games
Atari ST games
DOS games
Point-and-click adventure games
Video games developed in France